{{safesubst:#invoke:RfD||2=White Points|month = January
|day = 20
|year = 2023
|time = 11:57
|timestamp = 20230120115712

|content=
REDIRECT Aspy Bay

}}